The 2005–06 season was the eighth season in the existence of U.C. AlbinoLeffe and the club's third consecutive season in the second division of Italian football. In addition to the domestic league, AlbinoLeffe participated in this season's edition of the Coppa Italia.

Players

First-team squad

Transfers

Pre-season and friendlies

Competitions

Overall record

Serie B

League table

Results summary

Results by round

Matches

Coppa Italia

References

U.C. AlbinoLeffe seasons
AlbinoLeffe